Expansionist nationalism, is an aggressive radical form of nationalism or ethnic nationalism (ethnonationalism) that incorporates autonomous, heightened ethnic consciousness and patriotic sentiments with atavistic fears and hatreds focused on "other" or foreign peoples, framing a belief in expansion or recovery of formerly owned territories through militaristic means.

History 
The term was coined during the late nineteenth century
as European powers indulged in the "Scramble for Africa" (1880s onwards), but has been most associated with militarist governments during the 20th century, including Fascist Italy, Nazi Germany, the Japanese Empire, and the  Central and Eastern European countries of Albania (Greater Albania), Bulgaria (Greater Bulgaria), Croatia (Greater Croatia), Hungary (Greater Hungary), Romania (Greater Romania) and Serbia (Greater Serbia).

Ideology 
Expansionist nationalism is distinguished from liberal nationalism by its advocacy of chauvinism and racialism, its belief in the superiority of one's own nation and dominance combined with the exclusive right of self-determination. Nations are not considered equal with regard to their right of self-determination, rather some nations are believed to possess characteristics or qualities that make them superior to others. Expansionist nationalism therefore asserts the state's right to increase its borders at the expense of its neighbors.

See also 
 Generalplan Ost
 Greater Ukraine
 Irredentism
 Integral nationalism
 Jingoism
 Lebensraum
 Manifest Destiny
 Nazism
 Pan-Africanism
 Pan-Arabism
 Pan-Asianism
 Pan-Germanism
 Pan-Slavism
 Pan-Turkism
 Revisionist Zionism

References

Nationalism
Political theories
Political ideologies